45 may refer to: 
 45 (number)
 one of the years 45 BC, AD 45, 1945, 2045

Film
45 (film), directed by Peter Coster (2009)
.45 (film), directed by Gary Lennon (2006)

Music
45 (Jaguares album), 2008
45 (Kino album), 1982
"45" (Bon Iver song), 2016
"45" (The Gaslight Anthem song), 2012
"45" (Shinedown song), 2003
"45" (Elvis Costello song), 2002
"Forty Five", a song by Karma to Burn from the album Appalachian Incantation, 2010
45 rpm record or 45, a common form of vinyl single

Other uses
Donald Trump, the 45th President of the United States, with the nickname "45"
45 (book), written by Bill Drummond
.45 caliber, a family of firearm cartridges
 A nickname for a handgun chambered in .45 caliber, such as the M1911 pistol or Colt Single Action Army
.45 ACP, pistol cartridge
.45 Colt, revolver cartridge
Jacobite rising of 1745 or "The '45", in the United Kingdom
Forty-fives, a card game
'The 45%', collective term used by Scottish independence campaigners (after ratio of support in 2014 referendum) 
Fortyfive, a software development company